The Landtag of Upper Austria is the unicameral parliament of Upper Austria, established in 1920. The most recent election was the 2021 Upper Austrian state election.

References

External links
official website (German)

1920 establishments in Austria
Upper Austria